Orin Densmore Sr. (September 22, 1805 – June 3, 1872) was an American businessman, farmer, teacher, and politician.

Dessmore was born in Sullivan County, New Hampshire. He lived in New York and Wisconsin. In 1857, Densmore moved to Red Wing, Goodhue County, Minnesota, with his wife and family. He was a farmer and a silversmith. Densmore was also involved in the lumber business. Densmore served as the Goodhue County Treasurer, as the Red Wing Probate Judge and as the Red Wing City Recorder. He served in the Minnesota House of Representatives in 1870 and 1871.

References

1805 births
1872 deaths
People from Sullivan County, New Hampshire
People from Red Wing, Minnesota
Businesspeople from Minnesota
Members of the Minnesota House of Representatives